Fleet Canada Inc., the successor to the Fleet Aerospace Inc division of Magellan Aerospace Inc, is a manufacturer of aerospace structures, component parts, and assemblies to approved design data. Capabilities include tooling, detail fabrication, bonding, and finishing, chemical processing, heat treating, and NDT (LPI).

Established in 2006, Fleet Canada Inc. has not been affiliated with Magellan Aerospace Inc since the closure of Fleet Aircraft in 2003.

History 
The company was formed in 2006, but its history can be traced back to Reuben Fleet, who commenced manufacturing operations of Fleet Aircraft on March 23, 1930. A state-of-the-art facility for the day, the plant promptly began turning out complete aircraft for military and civilian training. By 1938, Fleet had enlarged the factory to ten times its original size and the Fleet Finch Trainer had become the primary training aircraft for the British Commonwealth Air Training Plan. After the war, Fleet produced a successful light civilian 2-seater, the Fleet Canuck. The making of complete aircraft ceased in the early 1950s and the manufacture of quality structural components became the core business.

Clients

Fleet Canada's products are sold to various aerospace clients:

 Boeing — parts used for CH — 47 Chinook Helicopter
 Bombardier Aerospace — parts used for Bombardier Q series
 Viking Air — parts used for Twin Otter 400 Series
 DeHavilland Aircraft Canada — parts used for CL-215, CL-415 & DHC-515 Waterbombers

Products

 Tail Boom for helicopters
 Airframe structural assemblies
 Longerons/Stringers
 Bulkheads
 Floor Panels
 Airframe structural assemblies
 Rib Doubler

References

External links 
 Fleet Canada Inc website

Aerospace companies of Canada
Aircraft manufacturers of Canada
Companies based in Ontario
Manufacturing companies established in 2006